The Ferguson House is a historic house at 416 North Third Street in Augusta, Arkansas.  It is a two-story wood-frame structure, with a side gable roof and clapboard siding.  Its main facade is five bays wide, with a central projecting portico with square supporting columns, and a gabled pediment.  The interior has a well-preserved central-hall plan.  It was built in 1861 by James and Maria Ferguson, and is one of the city's oldest buildings.

The house was listed on the National Register of Historic Places in 1975.

See also
National Register of Historic Places listings in Woodruff County, Arkansas

References

Houses on the National Register of Historic Places in Arkansas
Greek Revival houses in Arkansas
Houses completed in 1858
Houses in Woodruff County, Arkansas
National Register of Historic Places in Woodruff County, Arkansas
1858 establishments in Arkansas
Augusta, Arkansas